Ethan Allen Brown (July 4, 1776February 24, 1852) was a Democratic-Republican politician. He served as the seventh governor of Ohio.

Biography
Brown was born in Darien, Connecticut to Roger Brown, a prosperous farmer and a Revolutionary War veteran.

Brown studied with a private tutor, and he was proficient in French, Latin and Greek. He studied law under Alexander Hamilton for five years and was admitted to the bar in 1802.

Career
He moved near Cincinnati, Ohio in 1803. He was appointed to the Ohio Supreme Court in 1810 and was re-elected in 1817. Brown was elected to the governorship a year later and was re-elected in 1820. He resigned on January 3, 1822 to take office in the U.S. Senate after the death of William A. Trimble. He was defeated for re-election in 1824 by William Henry Harrison.

Brown was the Ohio Presidential elector in 1828 for Andrew Jackson. An active supporter of Andrew Jackson, Brown was appointed Chargé d'Affaires to Brazil in 1830 and served for four years. He then served as commissioner of the General Land Office in Washington, D.C. from 1835 to 1836.

In 1836, he retired to a family farm in Indiana most likely staying at the David Brown House in Ohio County.  Brown later served a single term in the Indiana House of Representatives from 1841 to 1843.

Honors and memberships
Brown was elected a member of the American Antiquarian Society in 1818.

Death
Brown died in 1852 at a Democratic Convention held in Indianapolis, Indiana, and is buried in the Cedar Hedge Cemetery located in Rising Sun, the county seat of Ohio County, Indiana.

References

External links

 
 
 Site with locations of grave markers for political figures
Ohio Memory

1776 births
1852 deaths
Governors of Ohio
Members of the Indiana House of Representatives
Justices of the Ohio Supreme Court
People from Darien, Connecticut
American surveyors
Politicians from Cincinnati
United States senators from Ohio
Indiana Democratic-Republicans
Ohio Democratic-Republicans
Democratic-Republican Party United States senators
General Land Office Commissioners
1828 United States presidential electors
19th-century American diplomats
Democratic-Republican Party state governors of the United States
People from Ohio County, Indiana
Members of the American Antiquarian Society
19th-century American politicians